The Free Library of Philadelphia is the public library system that serves Philadelphia. It is the 13th-largest public library system in the United States. The Free Library of Philadelphia is a non-Mayoral agency of the City of Philadelphia governed by an independent Board of Trustees as per the Charter of the City of Philadelphia. The Free Library of Philadelphia Foundation is a separate 501c3 non-profit with its own board of directors and serves to support the mission of the Free Library of Philadelphia through philanthropic dollars.

History

Founding

The Free Library of Philadelphia was chartered in 1891 as "a general library which shall be free to all", through efforts led by Dr. William Pepper, who secured initial funding through a $225,000 bequest from his wealthy uncle, George S. Pepper. However, several libraries claimed the bequest, and only after the courts decided the money was intended to found a new public library did the Free Library finally open in March 1894. Its first location was three cramped rooms in City Hall. On February 11, 1895, the library was moved to the old Concert Hall at 1217-1221 Chestnut Street. Library officials criticized their new home as "an entirely unsuitable building, where its work is done in unsafe, unsanitary and overcrowded quarters, temporary make-shifts". On December 1, 1910, the Library was moved again, to the northeast corner of 13th and Locust Streets. Today, the Free Library of Philadelphia system, comprising 54 neighborhood library locations and the Rosenbach, advances literacy, guides learning, and inspires curiosity with millions of digital and physical materials; 28,000 yearly programs and events; free public computers and Wi-Fi; and rich special collections. With more than 6 million in-person visits and millions more online annually, the Free Library and the Rosenbach are among the most widely used educational and cultural institutions in Philadelphia and boast a worldwide impact.

Parkway Central Library

On June 2, 1927, the Parkway Central Library opened for service at its present location at 1901 Vine Street on Logan Square. The building had been in planning since 1911; various obstacles, including World War I, held up progress. The grand Beaux-Arts  building was designed by Julian Abele, chief designer in the office of prominent Philadelphia architect Horace Trumbauer, and first opened its doors in 1927. Its design, that of the adjacent Philadelphia Family Court building, and their placement on Logan Circle closely follow that of the Hôtel de Crillon and the Hôtel de la Marine on Paris's Place de la Concorde.

Mission

The mission of the Free Library of Philadelphia is "to advance literacy, guide learning, and inspire curiosity."

Services

Programs
The Free Library of Philadelphia hosts more than 25,000 events each year, including job-search workshops, small business programming, English as a Second Language conversation groups, and computer classes. The Free Library's Culinary Literacy Center, which opened in the spring of 2014 at the Parkway Central Library, offers culinary classes for children, teens, families, and adults to teach literacy skills through cooking as well as math, chemistry, nutrition, and health. The Library hosts a renowned Author Events Series, which brings more than 100 writers, politicians, scientists, researchers, and musicians to the Free Library annually. The Library also hosts the citywide One Book, One Philadelphia program, which encourages all Philadelphians to read and discuss the same book, fostering community and connection; the Summer Reading program, which engages some 50,000 Philadelphia school children each summer; and the Literacy Enrichment After-school Program (LEAP). In addition, the Free Library hosts months-long celebrations of literary milestones, from the birthdays of influential writers like Charles Dickens and William Shakespeare to the publication anniversaries of groundbreaking titles like Pride and Prejudice and Alice’s Adventures in Wonderland.

The Free Library also manages READ by 4th, a citywide effort of public and private organizations aiming to significantly increase the number of students in Philadelphia entering the 4th grade at reading level by 2020. READ by 4th's comprehensive strategy includes improving early learning, providing parents with resources to teach their children reading skills, emphasizing summer reading and other strategies to prevent learning loss, decreasing absenteeism by addressing behavioral and health concerns, and enhancing reading instruction in schools.

Digital services

The Free Library's digital offerings include nearly 300,000 streaming or downloadable ebooks; 1,000 public computers; 1,700-plus author event podcasts; 150 online databases; daily homework and computer literacy classes online; Hot Spot community computer training centers; and the roving Techmobile.

Hot Spots initiative

In March 2011, the library launched Free Library Hot Spots, placing new computer labs and computer trainers in existing community centers in low-income areas of the city. The initiative was funded by the John S. and James L. Knight Foundation and the Broadband Technology Opportunities Program.  Each Hot Spot provides computers, internet access, printers, and a small selection of Free Library materials. (These are in addition to the 650 public-access computers and free WiFi throughout the Free Library's 54 branches.)

In April 2012, the Free Library added The Techmobile, a Hot Spot on Wheels, which brings service to neighborhoods throughout Philadelphia. The Techmobile has six public laptops.

Impact

According to a study conducted by Penn's Fels Institute of Government, in 2017 nearly 25,000 people learned to read or taught someone else to read solely because of the resources of the Free Library. In addition, nearly 1,000 people found jobs based on the career resources of the Free Library, and some 8,600 entrepreneurs were able to start, grow or improve their small businesses because of programs and resources available free of charge at the Library.

Special collections
Located at the Parkway Central Library, the Free Library's Special Collections span genres and generations, from ancient cuneiform tablets to historic photographs of Philadelphia.

The Free Library of Philadelphia's Children's Literature Research Collection houses an extensive research collection of children's literature published after 1836.

The Rare Book Department features one of the world's most renowned Charles Dickens collections, with first editions, personal letters, and Dickens’ stuffed pet raven, Grip, as well as extensive collections of illuminated manuscripts, Americana, Beatrix Potter, early children's books, Edgar Allan Poe, Pennsylvania German folk art, and more. The collection includes over 50 Books of Hours and numerous bibles, liturgical texts, and psalters, including the Lewis Psalter (Lewis E M 185), a masterpiece of Parisian illumination from the reign of Saint Louis.

The Free Library's music collections include the Edwin A. Fleisher Collection of Orchestral Music, the largest lending library of orchestral performance sets in the world.

Additionally, the Rosenbach Museum & Library is a subsidiary of the Free Library of Philadelphia Foundation.

Neighborhood libraries
In addition to the Parkway Central Library and the Rosenbach in downtown Philadelphia, the system operates 54 neighborhood and regional library locations throughout the city.  Many of these locations were funded by Andrew Carnegie, who donated US$1.5 million to the library in 1903.

See also

 List of Carnegie libraries in Philadelphia
 Philadelphia Reading Olympics

References

External links

 

1891 establishments in Pennsylvania
Carnegie libraries in Pennsylvania
Culture of Philadelphia
Education in Philadelphia
Library buildings completed in 1891
Libraries in Philadelphia
Logan Square, Philadelphia
Public libraries in Pennsylvania
Tourist attractions in Philadelphia